Nate Haller is a Canadian country singer and songwriter. He released his debut album Party in the Back on Starseed Records in 2022. The album includes the singles "Lightning in a Bottle", "Somewhere to Drink", "Ain't Like Me", and "Budweiser".

Early life
Haller grew up on a farmhouse in Waterloo, Ontario with both of his siblings taking an interest in music, but he stated that he initially only played his brother's guitar on occasion. He then was inspired to pursue music himself after seeing Australian singer-songwriter Xavier Rudd perform live while he was in high school. Soon after this, he was encouraged by a teacher in Grade 11 to enter a talent show, and began writing songs afterwards.

Career
Haller began his music career playing in Kira Isabella's live band for seven years. After befriending Callum Maudsley, a guitar player in the live band for the Reklaws, Haller moved in with Maudsley and the Reklaws' Stuart Walker. He subsequently started touring for three years as the acoustic guitar player for the Reklaws, and credits them for showing him "how the industry works". Haller began fully pursuing his solo career after the onset of the COVID-19 pandemic, and signed with Starseed Entertainment in 2021.

Haller released his debut single "Lightning in a Bottle" in March 2021, and it subsequently became his first top ten on the Billboard Canada Country chart. He followed it up with the promotional single "Grew Up On" in June 2021, and his second radio single "Somewhere to Drink" in September 2022, which features Brett Kissel and the Reklaws. Haller was semi-finalist in the Sirius XM "Top of the Country" contest in 2021. In January 2022, Haller released the promotional single "Broken", and then followed it up with his third radio single "Ain't Like Me" in May 2022. He won "Rising Star" at the 2022 Country Music Association of Ontario Awards, and received a nomination in the same category at the 2022 CCMA Awards.

Discography

Albums

Singles

Music videos

Awards and Nominations

References

Living people
Canadian country singer-songwriters
Canadian male singer-songwriters
Singers from Ontario
Musicians from Waterloo, Ontario
21st-century Canadian male singers
Year of birth missing (living people)